Haima , is a town in the central Oman.

It is the capital of the central region of Oman called Al Wusta Governorate.

Permanent settlement began after a team of oil explorers sunk a water well there.  This well, along with another dug in al-Ajaiz, became the first permanent water sources in Jiddat il-Harasiis.  The well in Haima was used less than that in al-Ajaiz on account of the poor grazing lands surrounding it. 

In 1982 a school for boys and later one for girls was opened in Haima.  Families from the Harasiis tribe have increasingly settled in this location while schools are in session.

Climate 
Haima has a hot desert climate (Köppen climate classification: BWh).

See also 
 List of cities in Oman

References 

Populated places in Oman
Al Wusta Governorate (Oman)